The Marina of Rome (Italian: Porto Turistico di Roma) is a tourist port that rises along the banks of Ostia, in the Municipality of Rome (Italy).

History
The port, designed in the 1990s, it is part of a redevelopment project of the area of the Ostia Seaplane Base; in fact, the Centro Habitat Mediterraneo, an oasis of  managed by LIPU (Italian Bird Protection League) extends not far from one of the entrances of the port.

The construction was entrusted to ATI (Attività Turistiche e Imprenditoriali), which inaugurated the Marina in 32 months, with an investment of 120 billion lire, in June 2001.

In 2015 Mauro Balini, the administrator of the port, was arrested on charges of bankruptcy (regarding the stimulated bankruptcy of ATI), issue of false invoices, money laundering and corruption; the port is therefore administered by the Italian judiciary.

Facilities of the Marina 
 833 berths with the possibility of hosting mega-yachts up to 55 meters long;
 80 shops for commercial and catering activities, apartments and offices;
 an outdoor amphitheater with 750 seats;
 2,300 parking spaces on internal and external parking lots;
 a shipyard equipped with a 400-ton travel lift;
 offices and headquarters of the law enforcement (Guardia di Finanza, Carabinieri, Polizia di Stato and Harbour Office) and a post office.

Access 
 From Lungomare Duca degli Abruzzi and Via dell'Idroscalo.

Notes

External links
 Official website of the Marina of Rome
 The port on ostiaonline.it
 The port on visitostia.tv

Ostia
Ports and harbours of Italy
Transport in Rome